Sweet Tooth is an American fantasy drama streaming television series developed by Jim Mickle. It is based on the comic book of the same name by Jeff Lemire and premiered on Netflix on June 4, 2021. In July 2021, the series was renewed for a second season which is set to be released on April 27, 2023.

Premise
Ten years ago in "The Great Crumble", society collapsed due to a viral pandemic of a disease known as the Sick (or the H5G9 virus), wiping out most of the world's human population, and leading to the mysterious emergence of hybrid babies that are born part human, part animal.

Unsure whether hybrids are the cause of the virus or a result of the virus, many humans fear and hunt the hybrids. Gus, a half-deer hybrid, lives in the wilderness with his father – who dies when Gus is nine years old. Gus discovers a box buried by his father beneath a tree; the box contains what Gus believes is a photograph of his mother, with the word "Colorado" written on it.

A year after his father's death, Gus accidentally sets a fire before deciding to leave his and his father's house in the wilderness to find his mother. The fire alerts nearby hunters to his location, and they try to kill Gus for sport. However, when Gus speaks, the hunters are visibly startled. The hunters are then killed by Tommy Jepperd, "Big Man", a lone traveller, who afterwards tries to leave Gus behind, but Gus follows him. Gus keeps insisting that Jepperd will escort him to Colorado to find his mother. Jepperd resists, but he ends up protecting Gus, who won't leave him alone.

The story also follows Dr. Aditya Singh as he and his wife try to find a cure for the Sick, and Aimee, a former therapist who tries to protect her sanctuary for hybrids, which is called "The Preserve".

Cast

Main

 Nonso Anozie as Tommy Jepperd, a traveler and reformed Last Man who saves Gus from poachers and reluctantly accompanies him on his journey to find his mother. Gus refers to him as "Big Man". He was a famous professional football player before the apocalypse.
 Christian Convery as Gus, a sheltered and naive 10-year-old half-human, half-deer boy who wants to find his mother. Tommy refers to Gus as "Sweet Tooth" due to his obsession with candies.
 Adeel Akhtar as Dr. Aditya Singh, a doctor who is desperate to find the cure for the disease caused by the H5G9 virus, also known as the Sick, in order to cure his infected wife Rani
 Stefania LaVie Owen as Bear, the leader and founder of the Animal Army who saves hybrids. It is later revealed that her name is Rebecca "Becky" Walker.
 Dania Ramirez as Aimee Eden, a former therapist who creates a safe haven for hybrids called The Preserve
 Aliza Vellani as Rani Singh, Dr. Aditya Singh's wife who has the Sick
 James Brolin as the narrator
 Will Forte as Pubba, Gus' father who raised him in a secluded cabin in Yellowstone National Park to protect him from the outside world of hatred towards hybrids. It is later revealed that his name is Richard Fox. He was a janitor at Fort Smith Labs in Goss Grove, Colorado.
 Neil Sandilands as General Abbot (season 2; recurring season 1), the leader of the Last Men, who hunts hybrids. It is later revealed that his first name is Douglas.
 Naledi Murray as Wendy (season 2; recurring season 1), Aimee's adopted hybrid daughter who is half-pig and half-human. Aimee often refers to her as "Pigtail". She is the biological daughter of Bear's foster parents.
 Marlon Williams as Johnny (season 2; co-starring season 1), General Abbot's younger brother
 Christopher Cooper Jr. as Teddy Turtle (season 2)
 Yonas Kibreab as Finn Fox (season 2)

Recurring

 Sarah Peirse as Dr. Gladys Bell, a doctor who is dying of cancer and leaves her research of finding a cure for the Sick to Dr. Singh. It is later revealed that she does not have cancer, but is refusing to continue her research, much to General Abbot's dismay.

Guest starring

 Amy Seimetz as Birdie, a woman whom Gus assumes is his mother. It is later revealed that her first name is Gertrude. She was a geneticist at Fort Smith Labs.

Episodes

Series overview

Season 1 (2021)

Season 2

Production

Development
On November 16, 2018, it was announced that streaming service Hulu had given a pilot order to a potential television series adaptation of the comic book series. The pilot was expected to be written and directed by Jim Mickle who was also set to executive produce alongside Robert Downey Jr., Susan Downey, Amanda Burrell and Linda Moran. Production companies involved with the pilot were slated to consist of Team Downey and Warner Bros. Television. On April 9, 2020, it was announced that the series had been moved from Hulu to Netflix. On May 12, 2020, Netflix had given the production a series order that consists of eight episodes with Evan Moore attached to the series as a producer and Beth Schwartz served as a writer, an executive producer, and co-showrun alongside Mickle. On July 29, 2021, Netflix renewed the series for an 8-episode second season.

Lemire has acknowledged that the series has a lighter tone than the comic book series, stating that he and Mickle wanted the series to bring a new perspective to the post-apocalyptic genre after what they believed to be an oversaturation of dark dystopian fiction released since the original comic was published.

Casting
On May 12, 2020, Christian Convery, Nonso Anozie, Adeel Akhtar, and Will Forte were cast in starring roles while James Brolin is set to narrate the series. On July 30, 2020, Dania Ramirez joined the main cast. On August 19, 2020, Neil Sandilands was cast in an undisclosed capacity. On September 30, 2020, Stefania LaVie Owen joined the cast in a starring role. On November 2, 2020, Aliza Vellani was promoted to series regular ahead of the series premiere.

In March 2023, Naledi Murray, Neil Sandilands and Marlon Williams were promoted to series regulars while Christopher Cooper Jr. and Yonas Kibreab joined the cast as series regulars for the second season.

Filming
In July 2020, New Zealand granted the series permission to film, despite the recent travel restrictions due to the COVID-19 pandemic. On September 30, 2020, it was reported that the series had resumed filming after the COVID-19 pandemic halted production months earlier, with filming concluding around mid-December 2020. Filming for the second season took place in New Zealand from January to May 2022.

Release
The first season of Sweet Tooth was released on June 4, 2021. The eight-episode second season is scheduled to premiere on April 27, 2023.

Reception

Audience viewership
On July 20, 2021, Netflix revealed that the series has been watched by 60 million households since its June 4 release.

Critical response

The review aggregator website Rotten Tomatoes reported an approval rating of 97% based on 74 critic reviews, with an average rating of 8/10. The website's critical consensus reads, "Emotionally engaging, superbly acted, and incredibly entertaining, Sweet Tooth will satisfy fantasy fans of all ages." Metacritic gave the series a weighted average score of 78 out of 100 based on 19 critic reviews, indicating "generally favorable reviews".

Reviewing the series for Rolling Stone, Alan Sepinwall gave a rating of 3.5/5 and said, "Whether Gus and friends are having scary adventures or fun ones, those parts of Sweet Tooth are full of life, and as exciting or tense as needed. The show can be hit or miss, though, when it moves away from Gus." In her review of the series, Lucy Mangan of The Guardian gave the series 3 out of 5 stars, saying "Sweet Tooth is part fantasy, part sci-fi, part whimsy, part cold-eyed realism and most points in between. It is either warmly eccentric or hysterically crazy, perfect entertainment or a horrifying attempt to parlay the pandemic into a commercially palatable mashup. It is undoubtedly aimed at a younger-than-full-adult audience." Daniel D'Addario of Variety also gave the series a positive review, writing "Throughout, the show is made with a surprising degree of curiosity about what changes in society would look like across varying sorts of communities, and with a capacious imagination to boot. And while it envisions a world transformed by illness and pain, "Sweet Tooth" feels fundamentally light of touch and, well, sweet of intention. Its pandemic-riven world has been torn apart, to be sure, and in the wake comes dissension — but kindness and connection, too. Change provides the opportunity for grand-scale reimagining of what life can look like or be, as well as small opportunities to come into one's own — to find one's humanity, even when wearing deer antlers."

Brian Tallerico of RogerEbert.com wrote in his review that "Netflix's brilliant "Sweet Tooth" may not be a direct commentary on what the world has been through in the last year, but the presence of that real-world echo is undeniable. It's a show about a devastating virus that leads people to distrust one another, go into hiding, allow their fear to drive their decisions, and ultimately form unexpected bonds. It's about isolation and grief, but it is also very much about the unpredictable connections that can end up defining us. It's intense, riveting storytelling that recalls the spirit of Amblin almost more than the nostalgia warehouse that is "Stranger Things," the king of Netflix Originals. It would have been excellent television in any year, but "Sweet Tooth" strikes a different chord in 2021 than anyone could have expected." Ben Travers of Indiewire gave the series a B- and wrote "The series' efficient storytelling, world-building, and character work make it easy to switch off your brain and enjoy the adventure (that is, if you can get past The Sick). Strong performances help, too, and with so many critical core ingredients working smoothly, it's much easier for a genial little fantasy-adventure series to go down easy. "Sweet Tooth" may not offer a full meal, but sometimes all you need is a good piece of chocolate." Samantha Nelson of Polygon praised the series and wrote "The COVID-19 pandemic devastated some communities, while others seemed to entirely deny its existence. Sweet Tooth combines an examination of that inequality with the morals of other excellent post-apocalyptic stories, like 28 Days Later and Mad Max: Fury Road, which argue that survival is not enough to keep people functioning. The villains in Sweet Tooth are the ones who cling to a world that no longer exists, while the heroes try to build something better with the help of their found family. Sweet Tooth's subject matter might seem too bleak for the current era, but its timeliness also empowers the show's message of hope and shared strength."

Accolades
This series was nominated for the 2021 Harvey Awards for the Best Adaptation from Comic Book/Graphic Novel.

References

External links

2020s American drama television series
2021 American television series debuts
American fantasy drama television series
Children's and Family Emmy Award winners
Dystopian television series
English-language Netflix original programming
Post-apocalyptic television series
Television productions suspended due to the COVID-19 pandemic
Television series about children
Television series by Warner Bros. Television Studios
Television shows based on DC Comics
Television shows filmed in New Zealand